The Roman Catholic Diocese of Copiapó is a diocese located in the city of Copiapó in the Ecclesiastical province of La Serena in Chile.

History
 9 November 1946: Established as Apostolic Administration of Copiapó 
 21 April 1955: Promoted as Territorial Prelature of Copiapó
 31 October 1957: Promoted as Diocese of Copiapó

Leadership, in reverse chronological order
 Bishop Ricardo Basilio Morales Galindo, O. de M. (2020.06.20 – present)
 Bishop Celestino Aós Braco, O.F.M. Cap. (2014.10.18 – 2019.03.23), appointed Apostolic Administrator of Santiago de Chile
 Bishop Gaspar Quintana Jorquera, C.M.F. (2001.05.26 – 2014.07.25)
 Bishop Fernando Ariztía Ruiz (1976.12.11 – 2001.05.26)
 Bishop Carlos Marcio Camus Larenas (1968.01.31 – 1976.12.11), appointed Bishop of Linares
 Bishop Juan Francisco Fresno Larraín (1958.06.15 – 1967.06.28), appointed Archbishop of La Serena; future Cardinal 
 Bishop Francisco de Borja Valenzuela Ríos (1955.06.27 – 1957.08.20), appointed Bishop of Antofagasta; future Archbishop
 Archbishop Alfredo Cifuentes Gómez (Apostolic Administrator 1947.03.19 – 1948.06.17)

Sources
 GCatholic.org
 Catholic Hierarchy
  Diocesan website

Roman Catholic dioceses in Chile
Christian organizations established in 1946
Roman Catholic dioceses and prelatures established in the 20th century
Copiapo, Roman Catholic Diocese of
1946 establishments in Chile